The 1888 Illinois gubernatorial election was held on November 6, 1888.

Republican nominee Joseph W. Fifer defeated Democratic nominee John M. Palmer with 49.15% of the vote.

Democratic nomination

Candidates
John M. Palmer, former Governor
William A. J. Sparks, former U.S. Land Office Commissioner
Adlai Stevenson I, First Assistant United States Postmaster General
Murray F. Tuley, judge

Results
The Democratic state convention was held on May 23, 1888, at Springfield.

Palmer's nomination was then made unanimous.

Republican nomination

Candidates
Clark E. Carr, unsuccessful candidate for Republican nomination for Governor in 1880
James A. Connolly former State Representative, former United States Attorney for the Southern District of Illinois
Joseph W. Fifer, former State Senator
John McNulta, former U.S. Congressman for Illinois's 13th congressional district
Richard J. Oglesby, incumbent Governor (not formally nominated)
John Irving Rinaker, chairman of the Board of Railroad and Warehouse Commissioners of Illinois 
John C. Smith, incumbent Lieutenant Governor
Francis M. Wright

Results
The Republican state convention was held on May 2, 1888, at Springfield.

The results of the balloting were as follows:

Fifer's nomination was then made unanimous.

General election

Candidates
John M. Palmer, Democratic
Joseph W. Fifer, Republican 
David H. Harts, Prohibition, Prohibition nominee for Illinois's 14th congressional district in 1882
Willis W. Jones, Union Labor

Results

References

Notes

Bibliography

Governor
1888
Illinois
November 1888 events